The following is a list of squads for each national team competing at the 2018 UEFA Women's Under-17 Championship in Lithuania. Each national team had to submit a squad of 20 players born on or after 1 January 2001.

Group A

Lithuania
Lithuania named their squad on 1 May 2018.

Head coach: Ieva Kibirkštis

Germany
Germany named their squad on 19 April 2018.

Head coach: Anouschka Bernhard

Finland
Finland named their squad on 3 May 2018.

Head coach: Marko Saloranta

Netherlands
Netherlands named their squad on 3 May 2018.

Head coach: Marleen Wissink

Group B

Poland
Poland named their squad on 19 April 2018.

Head coach: Nina Patalon

Spain
Spain named their squad on 30 April 2018.

Head coach: Toña Is

Italy
Italy named their squad on 27 April 2018.

Head coach: Massimo Migliorini

England
England named their squad on 2 May 2018.

Head coach: John Griffiths

References

External links
Squads on UEFA.com

2018 UEFA Women's Under-17 Championship
Association football women's tournament squads